Paul Symphor (August 7, 1893 in Martinique – March 27, 1968 in Paris) was a politician from Martinique who served in the French Senate from 1948–1958.

References 

Paul Symphor page on the French Senate website

French people of Martiniquais descent
French Senators of the Fourth Republic
Senators of Martinique
1893 births
1968 deaths